The Taxation (International and Other Provisions) Act 2010 is an Act of Parliament in the United Kingdom that aims to ‘restate, with minor changes, certain enactments relating to tax; to make provision for purposes connected with the restatement of enactments by other tax law rewrite Acts; and for connected purposes’.

External links

United Kingdom Acts of Parliament 2010
Tax legislation in the United Kingdom